The El Malpais National Conservation Area is a federally protected conservation area in the U.S. state of New Mexico.  The El Malpais National Conservation area was established in 1987 and is managed by the Bureau of Land Management as part of the National Landscape Conservation System. The adjoining El Malpais National Monument was established at the same time and is managed by the National Park Service.

The  El Malpais NCA includes two wilderness areas — the West Malpais Wilderness and Cebolla Wilderness Area — covering almost .

Cultural landscape
For more than 10,000 years people have interacted with the El Malpais landscape. Historic and prehistoric Cultural landscape sites provide connections to past times. More than mere artifacts, these cultural resources are kept alive by the spiritual and physical presence of contemporary Indian groups, including the Puebloan peoples of Acoma, Laguna and Zuni, and the Ramah Navajo.

Features
El Malpais ('the badlands') is Spanish, pronounced Mal-(rhymes with wall)-pie-ees(rhymes with rice). The El Malpais National Conservation Area was established to protect nationally significant geological, archaeological, ecological, cultural, scenic, scientific, and wilderness resources surrounding the Grants Lava Flows.

In addition to the two wilderness areas, the NCA includes sandstone cliffs, canyons, La Ventana Natural Arch, the Chain of Craters Back Country Byway and the Narrows Picnic Area.

There are two visitor centers that serve the NCA, both off of I-40. El Malpais Visitor Center, operated jointly with the National Park Service, is on the south side of exit 85. The Bureau of Land Management Ranger Station is about eight miles south of exit 89 on State Highway 117.

References

External links
 
 official El Malpais National Conservation Area website
 Cebolla Wilderness Area website

Malpaíses (landform)
National Conservation Areas of the United States
Bureau of Land Management areas in New Mexico
Cultural landscapes
Great Divide of North America
Protected areas of Cibola County, New Mexico
Protected areas established in 1987
Units of the National Landscape Conservation System
1987 establishments in New Mexico
Nature reserves in New Mexico
Badlands of the United States